Wolff & Zwicker Iron Works was an American ironworks and shipbuilding company located in Portland, Oregon from about 1893 until it went into receivership in 1900.  Its plant was destroyed by fire on June 22, 1902. It built three of the early torpedo boats, the USS Davis, the USS Fox, and the USS Goldsborough for the United States Navy.

References

Wolff & Zwicker Iron Works

1893 establishments in Oregon
American shipbuilders
Defunct companies based in Oregon
Defunct shipbuilding companies of the United States
History of Portland, Oregon
Manufacturing companies based in Portland, Oregon
Manufacturing plants in the United States
Shipbuilding companies of Oregon
Shipyards of the United States
Industrial buildings and structures in Oregon